Gryllos (before 1927: Μουνδράζα - Moundraza) is a village and a community in the municipal unit of Skillounta, Elis, Greece. Its population in 2011 was 208 for the village and 300 for the community, which includes the small village Chani Gryllou. It is 3 km northwest of Graikas, 3 km northeast of Vrina and 5 km southeast of Krestena. The Greek National Road 76 (Krestena - Andritsaina - Megalopoli) runs through Chani Gryllou. Gryllos suffered damage from the 2007 Greek forest fires.

Population

See also

List of settlements in Elis

References

External links
Gryllos at the GTP Travel Pages

Skillounta
Populated places in Elis